Tangshan Sannühe Airport , or Tangshan Air Base, is a dual-use military and civil airport serving the city of Tangshan in Hebei Province, China.  It is located near the village of Sannühe, 20 kilometers from the city center in Fengrun District.  The airport was opened on 13 July 2010.

Airlines and destinations

See also
List of airports in China
List of the busiest airports in China
List of People's Liberation Army Air Force airbases

References

Airports in Hebei
Chinese Air Force bases
Airports established in 2010
2010 establishments in China
Buildings and structures in Tangshan